The whitenose shark (Nasolamia velox) is a species of shark of the family Carcharhinidae. The only member of the genus Nasolamia, it is found in the tropical waters of the eastern Pacific Ocean between latitudes 31° N and 18° S, between depths of 15 to 200 m. It can grow up to a length of 1.5 m. The whitenose shark is viviparous, with 5 young in a litter, and a birth size around 53 cm.

References

whitenose shark
Viviparous fish
Western Central American coastal fauna
Fish of Colombia
Fish of Ecuador
Fish of Peru
whitenose shark